Blumenau is a quarter in Winterthur, Zürich, Switzerland. It was at one point a part of Veltheim, which was its own municipality, but Veltheim was incorporated into Winterthur in 1922.

References

Winterthur